Asmar is one of the major cities in northeastern of Kunar province of Afghanistan and is the district center of Bar Kunar district, which is located in the most southern part of the district in a river valley.

History
The name Asmar is a combination of two Pashto language words of AS (horse) and MAR (snake).

Population
The exact population of Āsmār is unknown. But, according to the GeoNames geographical database, the total population is 15708.

Inhabitants
The Inhabitants of Asmar are over mostly Pashtuns, with a very small population of Nooristanis. The Pashtun tribes living in Asmar includes;
 Ul-Mulk
 Mamund
 Salarzi
 Sharzi, also known as Sharbikhel.
 Shinwari
And some others.

Notable people
Aslam Khan Asmari, who is a famous historical tribal leader of Sharzis.

References

Populated places in Kunar Province